Leopold Raymond Fletcher (3 December 1921 – 16 March 1991) was a Labour Party politician.

Early life and military career
Fletcher served in the British Army (1941–48) in East Asia, Southwest Asia and the British Army of the Rhine. He subsequently worked as military advisor on Joan Littlewood's Oh, What a Lovely War!. He became a journalist, author and lecturer and wrote two plays.

Parliamentary career
Fletcher contested Wycombe in 1955. He was Member of Parliament for Ilkeston from 1964 to 1983. He was deselected by his local party in December 1981. The seat was abolished in the 1983 boundary changes.

Spy allegations
He was revealed as a spy for the Soviet Union according to the records furnished by Vasili Mitrokhin, who arrived in the West after the Cold War.

The widow of the late Labour MP angrily denied the accusation that he was a Russian spy and claimed that he had, in fact, carried out missions for MI6. Catherine Fletcher maintained that not only was her husband an anti-Communist, but he had been asked to use his left-wing influence on behalf of Margaret Thatcher when she was Prime Minister to persuade Bettino Craxi to stand for the post of Italian premier.

See also
 Mitrokhin Archive

References

 Times Guide to the House of Commons, 1955, 1966 & 1979

External links 

1921 births
1991 deaths
Labour Party (UK) MPs for English constituencies
UK MPs 1964–1966
UK MPs 1966–1970
UK MPs 1970–1974
UK MPs 1974
UK MPs 1974–1979
UK MPs 1979–1983
British spies for the Soviet Union
British Army personnel of World War II
British people accused of spying for Czechoslovakia (1945–1989)
Royal Army Ordnance Corps officers
British republicans